Charles Quaino (2 May 1897 – 28 November 1977) was a Luxembourgian gymnast. He competed in nine events at the 1924 Summer Olympics.

References

External links
 

1897 births
1977 deaths
Luxembourgian male artistic gymnasts
Olympic gymnasts of Luxembourg
Gymnasts at the 1924 Summer Olympics
People from Differdange
20th-century Luxembourgian people